Substituted piperazines are a class of chemical compounds based on a piperazine core. Some are used as recreational drugs and some are used in scientific research.

List of substituted piperazines

Benzylpiperazines

 1-Benzylpiperazine (BZP)
 1-Methyl-4-benzylpiperazine (MBZP)
 1,4-Dibenzylpiperazine (DBZP)
 3,4-Methylenedioxy-1-benzylpiperazine (MDBZP)
 4-Bromo-2,5-dimethoxy-1-benzylpiperazine (2C-B-BZP)
 Methoxypiperamide (MeOP, MEXP) ((4-methoxyphenyl)(4-methylpiperazin-1-yl)methanone)
 Sunifiram (1-benzoyl-4-propanoylpiperazine)
 3-Methylbenzylpiperazine (3-MeBZP)

Befuraline, fipexide, and piberaline produce benzylpiperazine as a metabolite.

Phenylpiperazines

ortho-Substituted
 2-Chlorophenylpiperazine (oCPP)
 2-Methylphenylpiperazine (oMPP)
 2-Methoxyphenylpiperazine (oMeOPP)

Enpiprazole is known to produce oCPP as a metabolite.

Enciprazine was initially anticipated to produce oMeOPP as a metabolite, but this turned out not to be the case.

meta-Substituted
 3-Chlorophenylpiperazine (mCPP)
 3-Methoxyphenylpiperazine (mMeOPP)
 3-Trifluoromethylphenylpiperazine (TFMPP)
 1-(3-Chlorophenyl)-4-(2-phenylethyl)piperazine (3C-PEP)

Trazodone, nefazodone, mepiprazole, and others produce mCPP as a metabolite.

para-Substituted
 4-Chlorophenylpiperazine (pCPP)
 4-Fluorophenylpiperazine (pFPP)
 4-Methylphenylpiperazine (pMPP)
 4-Methoxyphenylpiperazine (MeOPP)
 4-Nitrophenylpiperazine (pNPP)
 4-Trifluoromethylphenylpiperazine (pTFMPP)

Multiple substitutions
 2,3-Dichlorophenylpiperazine (DCPP)
 2,3-Methylphenylpiperazine (DMPP)
 3-Trifluoromethyl-4-chlorophenylpiperazine (TFMCPP)

Others
 1-Phenylpiperazine (PP)

Other arylpiperazines
 1-(1-Naphthyl)piperazine (1-NP)
 1-(2-Pyrimidinyl)piperazine (1-PP)
 ORG-12962 (1-(5-trifluoromethyl-6-chloropyridin-2-yl)piperazine)
 Quipazine (2-piperazin-1-ylquinoline)

Many azapirones such as buspirone, gepirone, and tandospirone produce 1-PP as a metabolite.

See also
 Substituted α-alkyltryptamine
 Substituted amphetamine
 Substituted cathinone
 Substituted methylenedioxyphenethylamine
 Substituted phenethylamine
 Substituted phenylmorpholine
 Substituted tryptamine

References

Chemical classes of psychoactive drugs
Designer drugs
Piperazines